HTC Artemis or P3300 is a Windows Mobile 5.0 Pocket PC Phone Edition based pocket pc/phone manufactured by High Tech Computer. The device supports GPS, GPRS EDGE, Bluetooth, WiFi and quad-band GSM connectivity. The device is also sold by mobile phone operators Orange, O2 and T-Mobile, and is then branded Orange SPV M650, O2 Xda Orbit and T-Mobile MDA Compact III, respectively. The latter version lacks WiFi in most countries (including Germany).

Specifications

External links 
Official homepage

Artemis
Windows Mobile Professional devices